The phonology of the Hungarian language is notable for its process of vowel harmony, the frequent occurrence of geminate consonants and the presence of otherwise uncommon palatal stops.

Consonants 
This is the standard Hungarian consonantal system, using symbols from the International Phonetic Alphabet (IPA).

 {| class="wikitable" style="text-align:center;"
|+ Consonant phonemes of Hungarian
! 
! colspan="2" | Labial
! colspan="2" | Dental
! colspan="2" | Post-alveolar
! colspan="2" | Palatal
! colspan="2" | Velar
! colspan="2" | Glottal
|-
! Nasal
| style="border-right:0;" |  || style="border-left:0;" | 
| style="border-right:0;" |  || style="border-left:0;" | 
| colspan="2" | 
| style="border-right:0;" |  || style="border-left:0;" | 
| style="border-right:0;" |  || style="border-left:0;" | 
| colspan="2" | 
|-
! Plosive
| style="border-right:0;" width="25px" |  || style="border-left:0;" width="25px" | 
| style="border-right:0;" width="25px" |  || style="border-left:0;" width="25px" | 
| colspan="2" | 
| rowspan="2" style="border-right:0;border-top:0;" |  || rowspan="2" style="border-left:0;border-top:0;" | 
| style="border-right:0;" width="25px" |  || style="border-left:0;" width="25px" | 
| colspan="2" | 
|-
! Affricate
| colspan="2" | 
| style="border-right:0;" |  || style="border-left:0;" | 
| style="border-right:0;" width="25px" |  || style="border-left:0;" width="25px" | 
| colspan="2" | 
| colspan="2" | 
|-
! Fricative
| style="border-right:0;" |  || style="border-left:0;" | 
| style="border-right:0;" |  || style="border-left:0;" | 
| style="border-right:0;" |  || style="border-left:0;" | 
| colspan="2" | 
| colspan="2" | 
| style="border-right:0;" width="25px" |  || style="border-left:0;" width="25px" | 
|-
! Trill
| colspan="2" | 
| style="border-right:0;" |  || style="border-left:0;" | 
| colspan="2" | 
| colspan="2" | 
| colspan="2" | 
| colspan="2" | 
|-
! Approximant
| colspan="2" | 
| style="border-right:0;" |  || style="border-left:0;" | 
| colspan="2" | 
| style="border-right:0;" |  || style="border-left:0;" | 
| colspan="2" | 
| colspan="2" | 
|}

  It is debated whether the palatal consonant pair consists of stops or affricates. They are considered affricates or stops, depending on register, by Tamás Szende, head of the department of General Linguistics at PPKE, and stops by Mária Gósy, research professor, head of the Department of Phonetics at ELTE.

The phonemes  and  can appear on the surface as geminates: bridzs  ('bridge'). (For the list of examples and exceptions, see Hungarian dz and dzs.)

Hungarian orthography, unlike that of the surrounding Slavic languages, does not use háčky or any other consonant diacritics.

The most distinctive allophones are:
  becomes  if between a voiceless obstruent and a word boundary (e.g. lopj  'steal').
  becomes  e.g. between voiced obstruents, such as dobj be  'throw (one/some) in'
  may become  between two vowels (e.g. tehát  'so'),  after front vowels (e.g. ihlet  'inspiration'), and  word-finally after back vowels (e.g. doh  'musty') if it is not deleted (which it often is; e.g. méh  'bee', but even then, some dialects still pronounce it, e.g.).
 According to Gósy, it becomes  (rather than ) in words such as pech, ihlet, technika ('bad luck, inspiration, technology/technique'), while it becomes postvelar fricative in words such as doh, sah, jacht, Allah, eunuch, potroh.
  becomes  when geminated, in certain words: dohhal  ('with blight'), peches  ('unlucky').

 {| class="wikitable" style="text-align: center;"
|+ Examples
|-
! Phoneme
! colspan="2" | Example
! Translation
|-
| 
| pipa
| 
| 'pipe'
|-
| 
| bot
| 
| 'stick'
|-
| 
| toll
| 
| 'feather'
|-
| 
| dob
| 
| 'throw', 'drum'
|-
| 
| kép
| 
| 'picture'
|-
| 
| gép
| 
| 'machine'
|-
| 
| fa
| 
| 'tree'
|-
| 
| vág
| 
| 'cut'
|-
| 
| szó
| 
| 'word'
|-
| 
| zöld
| 
| 'green'
|-
| 
| só
| 
| 'salt'
|-
| 
| zseb
| 
| 'pocket'
|-
| 
| jó
| 
| 'good'
|-
| 
| hó
| 
| 'snow'
|-
| 
| cél
| 
| 'goal', 'target'
|-
| 
| edző
| 
| 'coach'
|-
| 
| csak
| 
| 'only'
|-
| 
| dzsessz
| 
| 'jazz'
|-
| 
| ló
| 
| 'horse'
|-
| 
| tyúk
| 
| 'hen'
|-
| 
| gyár
| 
| 'factory'
|-
| 
| ró
| 
| 'carve'
|-
| 
| ma
| 
| 'today'
|-
| 
| nem
| 
| 'no', 'gender'
|-
| 
| nyár
| 
| 'summer'
|}

Vowels

Hungarian has seven pairs of corresponding short and long vowels. Their phonetic values do not exactly match up with each other, so  represents  and  represents ; likewise,  represents  while  represents . For the other pairs, the short vowels are slightly lower and more central, and the long vowels more peripheral:
  are phonetically near-close .
  has been variously described as close-mid  and mid .
  and the marginal  are phonetically near-open , but they may be somewhat less open  in other dialects.
  is phonetically mid .
  and the marginal  are phonetically open central .

There are two more marginal sounds, namely the long  as well as the long .

Thus mentek could represent four different words: mëntëk  ('you all go'), mëntek  ('they went'), mentëk  ('I save'), and mentek  ('they are exempt').

 {| class="wikitable" style="text-align: center;"
|+ Examples
! Phoneme
! colspan="3" | Example
|-
| 
| hat
| 
| 'six'
|-
|
| a
| 
| 'the letter A'
|-
|
| Svájc
| 
| 'Switzerland'
|-
| 
| lát
| 
| 'see'
|-
| 
| ok
| 
| 'cause'
|-
| 
| tó
| 
| 'lake'
|-
| 
| fut
| 
| 'run'
|-
| 
| kút
| 
| 'well'
|-
| 
| lesz
| 
| 'will be'
|-
|
| e
| 
| 'the letter E'
|-
| 
| rész
| 
| 'part'
|-
| 
| visz
| 
| 'carry'
|-
| 
| víz
| 
| 'water'
|-
| 
| sör
| 
| 'beer'
|-
| 
| bőr
| 
| 'skin'
|-
| 
| üt
| 
| 'hit'
|-
| 
| tűz
| 
| 'fire'
|}

Vowel harmony

As in Finnish, Turkish, and Mongolian, vowel harmony plays an important part in determining the distribution of vowels in a word. Hungarian vowel harmony classifies the vowels according to front vs. back assonance and rounded vs unrounded for the front vowels. Excluding recent loanwords, Hungarian words have either only back vowels or front vowels due to these vowel harmony rules.

 {| class="wikitable" style=text-align:center
|+ Hungarian vowel harmony
|- 
! rowspan="2" | 
! colspan="2" | Front
! colspan="2" rowspan="2" | Back
|- 
! unrounded
! rounded
|- 
! Close
|  
|  
|  
|- 
! Mid
|  
|  
|  
|- 
! Open
| 
| 
|  
|}

Therefore, if a word contains back vowels, neutral vowels may appear alongside them. However, if only neutral vowels appear in a stem, the stem is treated as though it is of front vowel assonance and all suffixes must contain front vowels.

Vowel harmony in Hungarian is most notable when observing suffixation. Vowel harmony must be maintained throughout the entire word, meaning that most suffixes have variants. For example, the dative case marker  vs. . Stems that contain back vowels affix back vowel suffixes, and stems that contain only front vowels affix front vowel suffixes. However, the front vowel stems distinguish rounded vs. unroundedness based on the last vowel in the stem. If the last vowel is front and rounded, it takes a suffix with a front rounded vowel; otherwise it follows the standard rules. While suffixes for most words have front/back vowel variants, there are not many that have rounded/unrounded variants, indicating that this is a rarer occurrence.

 {|class=wikitable style=text-align:center
|+ Hungarian vowel harmony and suffixation
! Stem
! Gloss
! Description of stem
! Plural
|-
| asztal
| table
| Only back vowels
| asztal-ok
|-
| gyerek
| child
| Only neutral (front) vowels, last vowel unrounded.
| gyerek-ek
|-
| füzet
| notebook
| Only front vowels, last vowel unrounded.
| füzet-ek
|-
| ismerős
| acquaintance
| Only front vowels, last vowel rounded.
| ismerős-ök
|-
| papír
| paper
| Back vowel with neutral vowel
| papír-ok
|}

As can be seen above, the neutral vowels are able to be in both front and back vowel assonance words with no consequence.

 {|class=wikitable style=text-align:center
|+ Irregular suffixation
! Stem
! Gloss
! "At"
! "From"
|-
| híd
| bridge
| híd-nál
| híd-tól
|-
| cél
| aim
| cél-nál
| cél-tól
|}

These exceptions to the rule are hypothesized to have originated from the roots originally having contained a phoneme no longer present in modern Hungarian, the unrounded back vowel , or its long counterpart . The theory finds support from etymology: related words in other languages generally have back vowels, often specifically unrounded back vowels. For example, nyíl 'arrow' (plural nyíl-ak) corresponds to Komi ньыл , Southern Mansi .

Assimilation
The overall characteristics of the consonant assimilation in Hungarian are the following:

 Assimilation types are typically regressive, that is the last element of the cluster determines the change.
 In most cases, it works across word boundaries if the sequence of words form an "accentual unity", that is there is no phonetic break between them (and they bear a common phase stress). Typical accentual units are:
 attributes and qualified nouns, e.g. hideg tél  ('cold winter');
 adverbs and qualified attributes, e.g. nagyon káros  ~  ('very harmful');
 verbs and their complements, e.g. nagyot dob  ('s/he throws long toss'), vesz belőle  ('take some [of it]').
 There are obligatory, optional and stigmatized types of assimilation.
 The palatal affricates behave like stops in assimilation processes.

Voice assimilation
In a cluster of consonants ending in an obstruent, all obstruents change their voicing according to the last one of the sequence. The affected obstruents are the following:

 In obstruent clusters, retrograde voicing assimilation occurs, even across word boundaries:

 {| class="wikitable"
|-
! Voiced
! Voiceless
! Undergoes devoicing
! Undergoes voicing
! Causes voicing
! Causes devoicing 
|-
! b 
! p 
| dobtam  'I threw (it)'
| képzés  'training, forming'
| futball  'soccer'
| központ  'center'
|- 
! d 
! t 
| adhat  's/he can give'
| hétből  'from 7'
| csapda 
| pénztár  'cash desk'
|- 
! dz 
! c 
| edzhet  's/he can train'
| ketrecben  'in (a) cage'
| alapdzadzíki  'standard tzatziki'
| abcúg!  'down with him!'
|- 
! dzs 
! cs 
| bridzstől  '(because) of bridge [game of cards]'
| ácsból  'from (a) carpenter'
| barackdzsem  ~   'apricot jam'
| távcső  'telescope'
|- 
! g 
! k 
| fogtam  'I held (it)'
| zsákból  'out of (a) bag'
| állítgat  's/he constantly adjusts' 
| zsebkendő  'handkerchief'
|- 
! gy 
! ty 
| ágytól  'from (a) bed'
| pintyből  'from (a) finch'
| gépgyár  'machine factory'
| lábtyű  'socks with sleeves for the toes'
|- 
! v 
! f 
| szívtam  'I smoked/sucked (it)'
| széfben  'in (a) safe'
| 
| lábfej  'part of the foot below the ankle'
|- 
! z 
! sz  
| méztől  'from honey'
| mészből  'out of lime'
| alapzat  'base(ment)'
| rabszolga  'slave'
|- 
! zs 
! s 
| rúzstól  'from lipstick'
| hasba  'in(to) (the) stomach'
| köldökzsinór  'umbilical cord'
| különbség  ~  'difference'
|- 
! 
! h 
|  
| 
| 
| adhat  's/he can give'
|}

   is unusual in that it undergoes assimilation but does not cause voicing, e.g. hatvan ('sixty') is pronounced  not . Voicing before  occurs only in south-western dialects, though it is stigmatized.
 Similarly,  causes devoicing, but never undergoes voicing in consonant clusters. e.g. dohból  'from (the) musty smell'.
 Other than a few foreign words, morpheme-initial  does not occur (even its phonemic state is highly debated), therefore it is hard to find a real example when it induces voicing (even alapdzadzíki is forced and not used colloquially). However, the regressive voice assimilation before  does occur even in nonsense sound sequences.

Nasal place assimilation
Nasals assimilate to the place of articulation of the following consonant (even across word boundaries):
 only  precedes a velar consonant (e.g. hang , 'voice'),  precedes a labiodental consonant (e.g. hamvad , 'smolder'), and  precedes bilabial consonants.
  before labial consonants :  színpad  ('stage'), különb  ('better than'), énmagam  ('myself');
  before labiodental consonants : különféle  ('various'), hamvas  ('bloomy');
  before palatal consonants : pinty  ('finch'), ángy  ('wife of a close male relative'), magánnyomozó  ('private detective');
  before velar consonants : munka  ('work'), angol  ('English');
 Nasal place assimilation is obligatory within the word, but optional across a word or compound boundary, e.g. szénpor  ~  ('coal-dust'), nagyon káros  ~  ('very harmful'), olyan más  ~  ('so different').

Sibilant assimilation
 Voiceless sibilants form a voiceless geminate affricate with preceding alveolar and palatal stops (d , gy , t , ty ):
 Clusters ending in sz  or c  give : metszet  'engraving, segment', ötödször  'for the fifth time', négyszer  'four times', füttyszó  'whistle (as a signal)'; átcipel  's/he lugs (something) over', nádcukor  'cane-sugar'.
 Clusters ending in s  or cs  give : kétség  'doubt', fáradság  'trouble', egység  'unity', hegycsúcs  'mountain-top'.
 Two sibilant fricatives form a geminate of the latter phoneme; the assimilation is regressive as usual:
 sz  or z  + s  gives : egészség  'health', község  'village, community';
 sz  or z  + zs  gives : vadászzsákmány  'hunter's game'; száraz zsömle  'dry bread roll';
 s  or zs  + sz  gives : kisszerű  'petty', rozsszalma  'rye straw';
 s  or zs  + z  gives : tilos zóna  'restricted zone', parázs zene  'hot music'.
 Clusters zs+s , s+zs , z+sz  and sz+z  are rather the subject of the voice assimilation.
 If one of the two adjacent sibilants is an affricate, the first one changes its place of articulation, e.g. malacság , halászcsárda  'Hungarian fish restaurant'. Sibilant affricate–fricative sequences like  are pronounced the same as geminate affricate  during normal speech.
 Sibilant assimilation can be omitted in articulated speech, e.g. to avoid homophony: rozsszalma  ~  'rye straw' ≠ rossz szalma  'straw of bad quality', and  rossz alma  'apple of bad quality' as well.
 NB. Letter cluster szs can be read either as sz+s , e.g. egészség  'health', or as s+zs , e.g. liszteszsák  'bolting-bag' depending on the actual morpheme boundary. Similarly zsz is either zs + z , e.g. varázszár  'magic lock', or z + sz , e.g. házszám  'street-number'; and csz: cs + z  ~ c + sz . Moreover, single digraphs may prove to be two adjacent letters on morpheme boundary, like cs: cs  ~ c + s ; sz: sz  ~ s + z , zs: zs  ~ z + s .

Palatal assimilation
Combination of a "palatalizable" consonant and a following palatal consonant results in a palatal geminate. Palatalizable consonants are palatal ones and their non-palatal counterparts: d  ~ gy , l  ~ ly , n  ~ ny , ty  ~ t .
 Full palatal assimilation occurs when the ending palatal consonant is j : nagyja  'most of it', adja  's/he gives it'; tolja  's/he pushes it'; unja  's/he is bored with it', hányja  's/he throws it'; látja  's/he sees it', atyja  'his/her father'. The cluster lyj  is a simple orthographic variant of jj : folyjon  'let it flow'.
 Partial assimilation takes place if an alveolar stop (d, t) is followed by a palatal gy , ty : hadgyakorlat  'army exercises', nemzetgyűlés  'national assembly'; vadtyúk  'wild chicken', hat tyúk  'six hens'.
 Some sources report that alveolar stops change into their palatal counterparts before ny : lúdnyak  'neck of a goose', átnyúlik  'it extends over'. The majority of the sources do not mention this kind of assimilation.
 When the first consonant is nasal, the partial palatal assimilation is a form of the nasal place assimilation (see above).
 The full palatal assimilation is an obligatory feature in standard Hungarian: its omission is stigmatized and it is considered as a hypercorrection of an undereducated person. Partial palatal assimilation is optional in articulated speech.

Degemination
Long consonants become short when preceded or followed by another consonant, e.g. folttal  'by/with (a) patch', varrtam  'I sewed'.

Intercluster elision
The middle alveolar stops may be omitted in clusters with more than two consonants, depending on speed and articulation of speech: azt hiszem  ~  'I presume/guess', mindnyájan  'one and all', különbség  ~  'difference'. In morpheme onsets like str- , middle stops tends to be more stable in educated speech, falanxstratégia  ~  ~  'strategy based on phalanxes'.

Elision of 
  assimilates to a following  (e.g. balra , 'to the left').

 also tends to be omitted between a preceding vowel and an adjacent stop or affricate in rapid speech, causing the lengthening of the vowel or diphthongization (e.g. volt  'was', polgár  'citizen'). This is quite common in dialectal speech, but considered non-standard in the official language.

Hiatus
Standard Hungarian prefers hiatus between adjacent vowels. However some optional dissolving features can be observed:
 An optional weak glide  may be pronounced within a word (or a compound element) between two adjacent vowels if one of them is i , e.g. fiaiéi  ~  ('the ones of his/her sons'). This, however, is rarely transcribed.
 Adjacent identical short vowels other than a and e may be pronounced as the corresponding long vowel, e.g. zoológia  ~  ('zoology').
 Adjacent double i is always pronounced as single short  in the word endings, e.g. Hawaii . This reduction is reflected in the current orthography when the adjective-forming suffix -i is added to a noun ending in i. In this case suffix -i is omitted also in writing. e.g. Lenti (a placename) + -i → lenti 'of Lenti'.

Stress
The stress is on the first syllable of the word. The articles a, az, egy, and the particle is are usually unstressed.

References

Bibliography

External links
 The Hungarian alphabet (omniglot.com)

Phonology
Uralic phonologies